Chembai Memorial Government Music College, Palakkad, Kerala was established in 1957 as Government Music Academy offering Bachelor degree courses in Music, Veena, Violin and Mridangam and Master Degree course in Music.

About College
In 1980, it was given its present name in memory of the Carnatic musician from Palakkad, Chembai Vaidyanatha Bhagavathar. It offers various Bachelor of Arts degrees in vocal and Carnatic musical instruments and Master of Arts degree in Carnatic vocal.

There is also a proposal for making Chembai Memorial Government Music College in Palakkad as a Centre of Excellence by starting new courses in performing arts.

See also

References

External links
Chembai memorial govt music college
University of Calicut
University Grants Commission
National Assessment and Accreditation Council

Music schools in India
Arts and Science colleges in Kerala
Universities and colleges in Palakkad
Educational institutions established in 1957
1957 establishments in Kerala</ref>